Hourglass is the debut studio album by English contemporary folk musician Kate Rusby, released on 1 March 1997 on Pure Records.

Track listing
"Sir Eglamore" (Traditional; Rusby) - 4:14
"As I Roved Out" (Traditional) - 3:45
"Jolly Ploughboys" (Traditional) - 4:05
"Annan Waters" (Traditional) - 5:23
"Stananivy" (McCusker, Rusby) - "Jack and Jill" (Rusby; Traditional) - 3:06
"A Rose in April" (Rusby) - 5:38
"Radio Sweethearts" (Miller, McCusker) - 3:32
"I Am Stretched on Your Grave" (Frank O'Connor, Rusby) - 2:58
"Old Man Time" (Rusby) - 3:48
"Drowned Lovers" (Traditional) - 5:14
"Bold Riley" (Traditional) - 4:37

Personnel
Produced by John McCusker
Engineered by Moray Munro
Recorded at Temple Record Studio, Midlothian, Scotland
Mastered by Andy Seward

Kate Rusby - vocals, piano, guitar (3, 6, 9)
Ian Carr - guitar (1, 5, 7, 10)
Andy Cutting - diatonic accordion
Donald Hay - percussion
Conrad Ivitsky - double bass
Alison Kinnaird - cello
John McCusker - fiddles
Michael McGoldrick - flute, whistles
Tony McManus - guitar (2, 8)
Alan Reid - harmony vocals (4)
Eric Rigler - uilleann pipes
Davy Steele - harmony vocals (3, 11)

All tracks arranged by Kate Rusby and John McCusker
(Additional arrangement by Ian Carr on tracks 1, 4, 7, 10)

References

Kate Rusby albums
1997 debut albums